CHUP-FM is a Canadian radio station broadcasting at 97.7 FM in Calgary, Alberta. The station airs a hot adult contemporary format branded as C97.7, and is owned by Rawlco Communications. CHUP's studios are located on Railway Street Southeast in Calgary, while its transmitter is located at 85 Street Southwest and Old Banff Coach Road in western Calgary.

As of Winter 2020, CHUP is the 9th-most-listened-to radio station in the Calgary market according to a PPM data report released by Numeris.

History 
The 97.5 frequency, adjacent to the new 97.7, was originally occupied by CIRI-FM which moved to 106.5 in early 2008 to make room for the new 97.7 FM frequency.

After its approval in 2007, the station began on-air testing on February 19, 2008 as CIGY-FM and officially launched on March 6, 2008 at 10:00am MST. The first song played was Who Says You Can't Go Home by Jon Bon Jovi and Jennifer Nettles. The station's original music format was a hot adult contemporary/country mix. The station was originally branded  97.7 Calgary FM but changed its branding to The New 97.7 FM as of September 2008, then to Mix 97.7 in 2009 while maintaining the same format. In April 2010, the country lean was dropped and CIGY-FM became a full-time Hot AC station while maintaining the "Mix" branding making it the first time Calgary has had two Hot AC stations as it took on CKCE-FM, which plays more rhythmic-leaning tracks.

On May 20, 2011, the station changed its format to adult hits, branded as Up! 97.7, as well as their callsign to CHUP-FM. The modern AC format was moved to CFIT-FM.

On September 4, 2015, CHUP shifted to adult contemporary, branded as Soft Rock 97.7. On October 13, 2021, the station flipped back to hot AC, now branded as C97.7 but with a greater focus on top 40 music from the 1990s, 2000s and today.

References

External links
 C97.7
 
 

HUP
Radio stations established in 2008
HUP
HUP
2008 establishments in Alberta